"18" is a song by English-Irish boy band One Direction from their fourth studio album Four. The song was released on November 17, 2014 and was written by English singer Ed Sheeran and Oliver Frank. The song attained international success as it is certified gold in Australia and silver in the UK.

Background
English singer Ed Sheeran spoke about writing the song for One Direction in an interview saying, "I kinda wrote it from their perspective." He also mentions, "I'm really happy with the record that I wrote for them. It's the first record I've actually specifically written for them." The track runs at 124 BPM and is in the key of F# Minor. The song was recorded at Enemy Dojo, The Mountains, Los Angeles.

As of 2014, "18" sold 4,922 copies in the UK and 38,610 copies in the US.

Personnel
Credits for "18" adapted from Genius.

Musicians

One Direction
Niall Horan – vocals
Zayn Malik – vocals
Liam Payne – vocals
Harry Styles – vocals
Louis Tomlinson – vocals

Additional musicians
Oliver Frank - writing
Luke Potashnick - guitar
Matt Rad - drum programming, keyboard, producer
Steve Robson - bass, producer
Ed Sheeran - writing

Production
Ian Dowling - engineering
Șerban Ghenea - mixing
John Hanes - mixing
Sam Miller - engineering, producer

Charts

Certifications

References 

One Direction songs
2014 songs
Songs written by Ed Sheeran
Song recordings produced by Matt Rad
Song recordings produced by Steve Robson